These are the Official Charts Company's UK Indie Chart number-one albums of 2007.

Chart history

See also
List of number-one albums of 2007 (UK)
List of UK Independent Singles Chart number ones of 2007
List of UK Rock Chart number-one albums of 2007
List of UK R&B Albums Chart number ones of 2007

References

External links
Independent Albums Chart at the Official Charts Company
UK Top 40 Indie Album Chart at BBC Radio 1

Number-one indie albums
United Kingdom Indie Albums
2007